N'Tossoni is a village and rural commune in the Cercle of Koutiala in the Sikasso Region of southern Mali. The commune covers an area of 155 square kilometers and includes 5 villages. In the 2009 census it had a population of 8,793. The village of N'Tossoni, the administrative centre (chef-lieu) of the commune, is about 40 km northwest of Koutiala.

References

External links
.

Communes of Sikasso Region